James M. Cheyunski (born December 29, 1945) is a former American football linebacker in the NFL (NFL) for the Boston/New England Patriots, Buffalo Bills, and the Baltimore Colts. He played college football at Syracuse University. He is of Lithuanian descent.

References

American Football League players
American people of Lithuanian descent
American football linebackers
Boston Patriots players
New England Patriots players
People from Bridgewater, Massachusetts
Players of American football from Massachusetts
Buffalo Bills players
Baltimore Colts players
Syracuse Orange football players
1945 births
Living people
Sportspeople from Plymouth County, Massachusetts